Build Your Own Bazooka Tooth is a compilation album by American hip hop musician, Aesop Rock. The album was released in conjunction with a contest to create a remix of an Aesop Rock song using the a cappellas and instrumentals in this 2-disc set.

Aesop Rock released this album so that Internet mash-up artists could use the instrumentals and a cappellas in the album to create mash-ups, possibly with non-Aesop Rock songs, or so fans could listen to the instrumentals or a cappellas to better appreciate each.

Track listing

Disc one
 "Bazooka Tooth [Instrumental]" (I. Bavitz)
 Produced by Aesop Rock
 "N.Y. Electric [Instrumental]" (I. Bavitz)
 Produced by Aesop Rock
 "Easy [Instrumental]" (I. Bavitz)
 Produced by Aesop Rock
 "No Jumper Cables [Instrumental]" (I. Bavitz)
 Produced by Aesop Rock
 "Limelighters [Instrumental]" (I. Bavitz)
 Produced by Aesop Rock
 "Super Fluke [Instrumental]" (I. Bavitz)
 Produced by Aesop Rock
 "Cook It Up [Instrumental]" (J. Gibson/P.F.A.C./T. Simon)
 Produced by Blockhead
 "Freeze [Instrumental]" (I. Bavitz)
 Produced by Aesop Rock
 "We're Famous [Instrumental]" (J. Meline)
 Produced by El-P
 "Babies With Guns [Instrumental]" (I. Bavitz)
 Produced by Blockhead
 "The Greatest Pac-Man Victory In History [Instrumental]" (I. Bavitz)
 Produced by Aesop Rock
 "Frijoles [Instrumental]" (I. Bavitz)
 Produced by Aesop Rock
 " – 11:35 [Instrumental]" (I. Bavitz)
 Produced by Blockhead
 "Kill The Messenger [Instrumental]" (I. Bavitz)
 Produced by Aesop Rock
 "Mars Attacks [Instrumental]" (I. Bavitz)
 Produced by Aesop Rock

Disc two
 "Bazooka Tooth [A cappella]" (I. Bavitz)
 "N.Y. Electric [A cappella]" (I. Bavitz)
 "Easy [A Cappella]" (I. Bavitz)
 "No Jumper Cables [A cappella]" (I. Bavitz)
 "Limelighters [A cappella]" (I. Bavitz/S. Wallace/S. Wilds)
 Featuring Camp Lo
 "Super Fluke [A cappella]" (I. Bavitz)
 "Cook It Up [A cappella]" (I. Bavitz)
 "Freeze [A cappella]" (I. Bavitz)
 "We're Famous [A cappella]" (I. Bavitz/J. Meline)
 Featuring El-P
 "Babies With Guns [A cappella]" (I. Bavitz)
 "The Greatest Pac-Man Victory In History [A cappella]" (I. Bavitz)
 "Frijoles [A cappella]" (I. Bavitz)
 " – 11:35 [A cappella]" (I. Bavitz/J. Haynes)
 Featuring Mr. Lif
 "Kill The Messenger [A cappella]" (I. Bavitz)
 "Mars Attacks [A cappella]" (I. Bavitz)

Credits
 Executive producer: El-P
 Mastering: Tippy
 Engineering: Nasa, Spence Boogie
 Mixing: Nasa
 Photography: Ben Colen
 Illustrations: Tomer Hanuka

References

External links 
 Aesop Rock on Mush Records
 Aesop Rock on MySpace
 Def Jux Records official site

2004 compilation albums
Definitive Jux compilation albums
Albums produced by Aesop Rock
Aesop Rock albums